Charlotte Howard  may refer to:

Charlotte Jemima Henrietta Maria FitzRoy, married name Howard
Charlotte Fitzalan-Howard, Duchess of Norfolk
Charli Howard, English model